Prog may refer to:

Music
 Progressive music
 Progressive music (disambiguation)
 Progressive rock, a subgenre of rock music also known as “prog” 
 Progressive rock (radio format)
 Prog (magazine), a magazine dedicated to progressive rock
 Prog (album), a 2007 album by jazz trio The Bad Plus

Computing
 a computer program
 Computer programming

Fiction
 an issue of the British comic-series "2000 AD (comics)"
 Neftin and Vendra Prog, fictional characters from the Ratchet & Clank series.

Other
 Guatemalan Revolutionary Workers Party
 a prognostic chart

See also 
 Progg, a Swedish political music movement 
 Markus Prock, an Austrian luger and Olympic medalist
 Prague, the capital and largest city of the Czech Republic